Douzhangzhuang railway station (豆张庄站) is a fourth-class station at 97 km on Jingshan railway.

The station was built in 1907. It is located in Wuqing District, Tianjin.

The station was renamed 414 railway station in 1969 during the 10th anniversary of Mao Zedong's visit of Douzhangzhuang on April 14, 1959. It was renamed back on October 1, 1980.

Railway stations in Tianjin
Railway stations in China opened in 1907
Stations on the Beijing–Shanghai Railway